Shanta Thake is the Chief Artistic Officer of Lincoln Center, charged with expanding Lincoln Center’s cultural reach within New York City. Before taking the Lincoln Center position in September 2021, she was Associate Artistic Director/ Director of Artistic Programs at The Public Theater. In this capacity, Thake oversaw the growth and development of Public Works, Mobile Unit, Under the Radar, Joe’s Pub, The Shakespeare Initiative and Public Forum. Previously, she spent 10 years as the Director of Joe’s Pub at The Public, The Public Theater’s cabaret space named after Theater founder Joseph Papp. Under Ms. Thake’s direction, Joe’s Pub produced events at The Delacorte Theater in Central Park and in collaboration with Make Music New York, Under The Radar and DanceNOW, among other organizations. 

In 2011, Ms. Thake established New York Voices, a commission program that provides musicians with tools to develop original theater works. Recipients include Ethan Lipton, whose 2011 New York Voices debut No Place To Go went on to win an Obie Award, (Off-Broadway Theater Award). Other commissioned artists include Toshi Reagon, Bridget Everett, Allen Toussaint and more.

Ms. Thake also serves as one of three producers of globalFEST, a world music festival and non-profit organization. The organization has curated stages at Webster Hall, Bonnaroo, SXSW and Festival d’Ile de France and administers a touring fund to world music artists touring new markets in North America.

Ms. Thake acted as board chair for the theater company Waterwell, was the co-creator of Weimar New York and is an active member of the Middle Collegiate Church Jerriese Johnson Gospel Choir. Ms. Thake has been the recipient of the Association of Performing Arts Presenters Emerging Leader award as well as Theater Communications Group’s Leaders of Color grant.  She received a BA in Theater as well as a degree in Management from Indiana University and currently lives in Brooklyn.

References

1979 births
Living people
Indiana University alumni
American theatre directors
Women theatre directors